The Man That Might Have Been is a 1914 American short drama silent black and white film directed by William J. Humphrey. It is produced by Vitagraph Company of America.

Cast
 William J. Humphrey as William Rudd
 Leah Baird as Mrs. William Rudd
 Leo Delaney as Eric Rudd
 Anders Randolf as Kittredge

References

External links
 

American silent short films
1914 short films
Silent American drama films
1914 drama films
1914 films
American black-and-white films
Films directed by William J. Humphrey
Films based on works by Rupert Hughes
Vitagraph Studios short films
General Film Company
1910s American films
American drama short films